The Elms Historic District is a national historic district located at Excelsior Springs, Clay County, Missouri, United States. It encompasses 31 contributing buildings, 1 contributing site, and 7 contributing structures in a predominantly residential section of Excelsior Springs. The district developed between about 1887 and 1963, and includes representative examples of Gothic Revival, Tudor Revival, and Bungalow style architecture. It is anchored by the separately listed Elms Hotel and consists of two historic residential plats: the Central Park and the Elms Addition.

It was listed on the National Register of Historic Places in 2014.

See also

 National Register of Historic Places listings in Clay County, Missouri

References

External links

Historic districts on the National Register of Historic Places in Missouri
Gothic Revival architecture in Missouri
Tudor Revival architecture in Missouri
Bungalow architecture in Missouri
Buildings and structures in Clay County, Missouri
National Register of Historic Places in Clay County, Missouri